Chiranjeevi is a Tollywood film which released on 18 April 1985. This film was directed by C. V. Rajendran. This film stars Chiranjeevi, Vijayashanti with Bhanupriya in a small role. The film was a remake of Kannada film Naane Raja (1984).

Cast 
Chiranjeevi as Chiranjeevi
Vijayashanti as Chiranjeevi's lover
Bhanupriya as Vijayashanti's blind sister
Kaikala Satyanarayana as Chiranjeevi's father
Murali Mohan as Bhanupriya's lover

Plot
The plot revolves around a man, Chiranjeevi (Chiranjeevi), who is the son of a sincere Police officer (Kaikala Satyanarayana). Chiranjeevi's mother dies in his childhood, and his father brings him up. Chiranjeevi admires his dad very much. His weakness is he cannot tolerate anyone talking bad about his father. He falls in love with Vijayashanti and expresses his love. Bhanupriya plays the blind sister of Vijayashanti and Murali Mohan her lover. In a bank robbery, a thief hides money in Murali Mohan's bag. Vijayashanti accuses Chiranjeevi's father arresting Murali Mohan wrongly. Vijayashanti requests Chiranjeevi to help her, argument leads him to anger and hits her. Vijayshanti dies on the spot. What follows next is a series of murders that Chiranjeevi commits in his attempt at hiding the accidental death caused by him, as he does not want to fall lower in the eyes of his father. The movie ends when his father kills Chiranjeevi.

References

External links

1985 films
Films scored by K. Chakravarthy
1980s Telugu-language films
Telugu remakes of Kannada films
Films directed by C. V. Rajendran